Electronic Punks is a video by the British electronic band The Prodigy, released on VHS in 1995. It includes videos, live performances and rehearsals. Electronic Punks was broadcast on MTV.

The live sections of the video were recorded at The Apollo in Manchester, the DeMontford Hall in Leicester, Town & Country in Leeds & the Brighton Centre in Brighton  all on the band's Poison Tour. Towards the very end of the VHS tape, after the final credits (which uses the music from the Prodigy track "We Eat Rhythm"), a documentary is shown, which involves the making of the music video to the song Poison.

The video reached number 3 in the UK music video chart.

Track listing 
 "Voodoo People"
 "Rock and Roll" (Live)
 "Out of Space"
 Break and Enter 95" (Live)
 "One Love"
 "Their Law" (Live)
 "Wind It Up" (The Rewound Edit)
 "Voodoo People" (Live)
 "Poison"
 "No Good (Start the Dance)" (Live)
 "Charly"
 "Poison" (Live)
 "Everybody in the Place"
 "Rhythm of Life" (Live)
 "No Good (Start the Dance)"
 “We Eat Rhythm (End Credits)”

References

External links 
 Electronic Punks at Discogs
 Information about work at BrainKiller

1995 video albums
The Prodigy albums
XL Recordings albums
Albums produced by Liam Howlett